The McDougal Filling Station, at 443956 E. State Highway 60 near Vinita, Oklahoma, was built in 1941.  It was listed on the National Register of Historic Places in 2004.

It is a wood-frame building with "distinctive stone veneer" built around 1941 on Route 66.

References

Gas stations on the National Register of Historic Places in Oklahoma
National Register of Historic Places in Craig County, Oklahoma
Commercial buildings completed in 1941
U.S. Route 66
1941 establishments in Oklahoma